Beautiful Sin is a European power metal band. They are heavily influenced by the popular power metal band Helloween.

Beautiful Sin began when Uli Kusch met Belgian singer Magali Luyten, and wanted to record an album with her band. He agreed to produce a demo-CD for the band, but the recordings were never released.

A few years later, Uli was considering creating a new project next to Masterplan in which he would write all the music himself. In autumn of 2004 he began talking to Magali – this time about forming a band together.

Rounding out the rest of the line-up would be Pagan's Mind's Jørn Viggo Lofstad and Steinar Krokmo (coming from Uli's adopted home, Norway), and also Kusch's Masterplan-mate, Axel Mackenrott.

After the release of The Unexpected, Carl Johan Grimmark was added as a second guitarist.

Line-up 
Magali Luyten – vocals
Jørn Viggo Lofstad – guitars
Steinar Krokmo – bass
Axel Mackenrott – keyboards
Uli Kusch – drums

Discography 
The Unexpected (2006)

External links 
Beautiful Sin's MySpace site
Beautiful Sin at Metal Archives

Belgian heavy metal musical groups
German heavy metal musical groups
Norwegian heavy metal musical groups
Norwegian power metal musical groups
Swedish power metal musical groups
Musical groups established in 2005
2005 establishments in Belgium
2005 establishments in Germany
2005 establishments in Norway
2005 establishments in Sweden
Musical groups from Belgium with local place of origin missing 
Musical groups from Germany with local place of origin missing 
Musical groups from Norway with local place of origin missing 
Musical groups from Sweden with local place of origin missing